Gafurzhan Sabyrzhanuly Suyumbayev (Ğafurjan Sabyrjanūly Süiımbaev; born 19 August 1990) is a Kazakh football player who plays for FC Aksu as a defender, and represents the Kazakh national football team.

Career

Club
In July 2016, Suyumbayev signed for FC Kairat. On 19 January 2022, Kairat announced that Suyumbayev had left the club.

Career statistics

Club

International

Statistics accurate as of match played 26 March 2017

International goals
Scores and results list Kazakhstan's goal tally first.

References

1990 births
Living people
Kazakhstani footballers
Kazakhstan international footballers
Kazakhstan Premier League players
FC Ordabasy players
FC Irtysh Pavlodar players
FC Kairat players
People from Shymkent
Association football defenders